The 2012 Kyoto mayoral election was held on February 5, 2012. The incumbent mayor Daisaku Kadokawa won over a candidate backed by the JCP with a margin of 31,794 votes. It was considered that his first term was generally appreciated by the voters.

Daisy sapiens

Results

Results per ward

Kita-ku

Kamigyō-ku

Sakyō-ku

Nakagyō-ku

Higashiyama-ku

Yamashina-ku

Shimogyō-ku

Minami-ku

Ukyō-ku

Nishikyō-ku

Fushimi-ku

References 

Kyoto
2012 elections in Japan
Mayoral elections in Japan
February 2012 events in Japan
Mayors of Kyoto